Bollons Island is a small island in New Zealand's subantarctic Antipodes Islands group. It is the second largest island in the group behind Antipodes Island.

Geography
It lies to the northeast of the group's main island, Antipodes Island, separated from it by a 1.2 kilometre wide strait. The smaller Archway Island lies immediately to the northwest of Bollons Island.

Cliffs surround the island on all sides except the west.

History
The island is named after John Bollons, Master of the New Zealand Marine Department vessels, NZGSS Hinemoa and  SS Tutanekai.

Important Bird Area
The island is part of the Antipodes Islands Important Bird Area (IBA), identified as such by BirdLife International because of the significance of the group as a breeding site for several species of seabirds.

See also 
 Composite Antarctic Gazetteer
 New Zealand Subantarctic Islands
 List of Antarctic and subantarctic islands#List of subantarctic islands
 List of islands of New Zealand
 SCAR
 Territorial claims in Antarctica

Further reading
 Taylor, Rowley, (2006) Straight Through from London, the Antipodes and Bounty Islands, New Zealand.Christchurch: Heritage Expeditions New Zealand Ltd. .

References

Islands of the Antipodes Islands
Volcanoes of the New Zealand outlying islands
Important Bird Areas of the Antipodes Islands
Volcanic islands